Harrison White is a sociologist.

Harrison White may also refer to:

S. Harrison White, U.S. Representative from Colorado
Harrison White, musician in Bleeding Oath

See also
Harry White (disambiguation)